Darrell Williams (born August 3, 1993) is a former American football offensive tackle. He played college football at South Florida. He signed with the St. Louis Rams as an undrafted free agent in 2015.

College career
Williams attended and played college football at University of South Florida from 2011 to 2014.

Professional career

St. Louis / Los Angeles Rams
After going undrafted in the 2015 NFL Draft, Williams signed with the St. Louis Rams on May 8, 2015 as an undrafted free agent. On November 17, 2015, he was placed on injured reserve due to a dislocated wrist.

On September 3, 2016, Williams was placed on injured reserve.

In 2017, Williams played in all 16 games, including one start at right tackle.

On April 16, 2018, Williams re-signed with the Rams. He was waived on August 31, 2018.

Canadian Football League
Williams signed with the Hamilton Tiger-Cats on May 10, 2019. He was released before the start of the regular season on June 11, 2019. He signed to the practice roster of the Winnipeg Blue Bombers two days later, and was promoted to the active roster on October 4, 2019. He was placed on the retired list on July 10, 2020.

References

External links
South Florida Bulls bio
Los Angeles Rams bio

1993 births
Living people
People from Colquitt County, Georgia
Players of American football from Georgia (U.S. state)
American football offensive tackles
South Florida Bulls football players
St. Louis Rams players
Los Angeles Rams players
Jamaican players of American football
Sportspeople from Kingston, Jamaica
Hamilton Tiger-Cats players
Winnipeg Blue Bombers players
Ed Block Courage Award recipients